McConnell may refer to:

People
McConnell (surname), people with the surname

Places
McConnell, Illinois, an unincorporated community
McConnell, West Virginia, an unincorporated census-designated place in the United States
Lake McConnell, a large prehistoric lake in Canada
McConnell Lake (disambiguation), various lakes and a park
McConnell River, Nunavut, Canada
McConnell Range, a mountain range in British Columbia, Canada
McConnell Peak, a mountain in California, United States
McConnell State Recreation Area, California, United States
9929 McConnell, an asteroid

Other uses
McConnell baronets, in the Baronetage of the United Kingdom
McConnell Air Force Base, near Wichita, Kansas, United States
McConnell Arena, an ice hockey arena in Montreal, Quebec, Canada
McConnell House (disambiguation), various houses on the U.S. National Register of Historic Places
McConnell Center, University of Louisville
USS McConnell (DE-163), a World War II destroyer escort
McConnell Cup, a bridge team competition for women

See also
McConnel (disambiguation)
McConnells, South Carolina, a town